is a rather popular feminine Japanese given name which is also used as a surname.

Possible writings
Nanami can be written using different kanji characters and can mean:
as a given name
七海, "seven, sea"
七美, "seven, beauty"
七実, "seven, fruit"
七生, "seven, life"
奈波, "what, wave"
奈々美, "what, beauty"
奈々実, "what, fruit"
奈々生, "what, life"
菜々美, "greens, beauty"
菜々実, "greens, fruit"
菜々未, "greens, not yet"
The given name can also be written in hiragana or katakana.
as a surname
名波, "name, wave"

People with the name
, Japanese figure skating coach and choreographer
, Japanese voice actress
Nanami Inoue (奈々朱, born 1989), Japanese volleyball player
, Japanese sport wrestler
, Japanese handball player
Nanami Ohta (ななみ, born 1993), a Japanese actress
Nanami Sakuraba (ななみ, born 1992), Japanese actress
Nanami Shiono (七生, born 1937), Japanese author and novelist
Hiroshi Nanami (名波, born 1972), former Japanese professional football player
Shingo Nanami, Japanese manga artist
Nanami (wrestler) (ななみ, born 2006), Japanese wrestler

Characters
Nanami, a character in the 1968 film Hatsukoi Jigokuhen
Nanami, a character from Magics.
Nanami, a character in the role-playing game Suikoden II
Nanami-chan, the title character in the NHK anime series Nanami-chan
Nanami Aoyama, a character in Sakurasou No Pet Na Kanojo
Nanami Agawa (七生), a character in the Kerberos saga franchise
Nanami Ishikawa (七波), the central character in the manga Town of Evening Calm, Country of Cherry Blossoms
Nanami Jinnai (菜々美), a character in the anime series El-Hazard
Nanami Kiryuu (七実), a character from the anime and manga series Revolutionary Girl Utena
Nanami Konoe (七海), the main heroine of the anime series Lamune
Nanami Madobe (ななみ), the mascot character of the Japanese version of Windows 7
Nanami Nono (七海), main character from the 2002 tokusastu series Ninpuu Sentai Hurricaneger
Nanami Nishijō (七海), a character from the anime, game and manga series Chaos;Head
Nanami Simpson, the main heroine of the anime series Tico of the Seven Seas
Nanami Takahashi (七美), the central character of the manga series Bokura ga Ita
Nanami Kai, a character from the anime and game series Sukisyo
Jun Nanami (名波), a student in the 2003 film Battle Royale II: Requiem
Lucia Nanami (七海), the main protagonist of the anime and manga series Mermaid Melody Pichi Pichi Pitch
Nanami Yasuri (鑢 七実), sister of the main character and an antagonist from Katanagatari.
Chiaki Nanami (七海千秋), one of the 16 students in the video game Danganronpa 2: Goodbye Despair.
Nanami Haruka (七海), the main heroine of the game, manga and anime series Uta no Prince-sama
Nanami Momozono (奈々生桃園), main character from the manga and anime series Kamisama Kiss
Nanami (ナナミ), a character from the video game Ōkamiden
Nanami Kanata (七海 哉太), one of the main guys of the game, manga, graphic novel, and anime series Starry Sky
Nanami Takatsuki, a character from the Dog Days
Nanami Arihara (七海 在原), a heroine from the visual novel RIDDLE JOKER
Nanami Kento (七海), a character from the Jujutsu Kaisen manga and anime series
Nanami Hiromachi (七美 広町), a character from the BanG Dream! music media franchise and bassist of the band Morfonica
Nanami Ryusui (七海 龍水), a character from the Dr. Stone manga and anime series 
Nanami Sai (七海 サイ), a character from the Dr. Stone manga and anime series
Nanami (ななみ), a character from the video game Dead or Alive Xtreme Venus Vacation

Other uses
Nanami-chan, the mascot character of the satellite television service NHK-BS

See also
FM Nanami, a Japanese local FM radio station
Hatsukoi Jigokuhen, a 1968 Japanese film a.k.a. Nanami, The Inferno of First Love

References

Surnames
Japanese feminine given names
Japanese-language surnames